The 1992–93 Buffalo Sabres season was the Sabres' 23rd season in the National Hockey League. Three Buffalo players scored at least 20 power-play goals each (Dave Andreychuk, Pat LaFontaine and Alexander Mogilny). Mogilny led all skaters in hat tricks during the regular season with 7, and Buffalo tied the Pittsburgh Penguins for most hat tricks scored by a team, with 10. The Sabres stumbled into the 1993 NHL Playoffs, losing their final 7 regular-season games.

Offseason

NHL Draft
Buffalo's draft picks at the 1992 NHL Entry Draft held at the Montreal Forum in Montreal, Quebec.

Regular season

Pat LaFontaine
LaFontaine exploded offensively in the 1992–93 season with a personal-best and team-record 148 points (53 goals and 95 assists).  The 148 points are also the most points ever scored by an American-born player in one season.  His play-making ability enabled his linemate, Alexander Mogilny to set a team season record with 76 goals, (both  LaFontaine's 95 assists and Mogilny's 76 goals still stand as the Sabres' team records).  LaFontaine finished as runner-up to Mario Lemieux in the scoring race and earned a spot on the postseason NHL All-Star Second Team.  He was also a finalist for the Hart Trophy as NHL MVP and the Lady Byng Trophy as the most sportsmanlike player.

During the 1993 playoffs, LaFontaine engineered another great moment:  in spite of playing with a damaged knee, as well as having fallen onto the ice, he still managed to set up Brad May's overtime, series-clinching goal against the Boston Bruins.

Season standings

Schedule and results

Playoffs
1993 Stanley Cup playoffs

Adams Division semi-finals

Boston vs. Buffalo

Buffalo's four-game sweep of the Bruins ended with a memorable overtime goal by Brad May at Buffalo's Memorial Auditorium, leading to Sabres' play-by-play announcer Rick Jeanneret's famous "May Day! May Day! May Day!" call.
 April 18 - Buffalo 5 Boston 4 (OT)
 April 20 - Buffalo 4 Boston 0
 April 22 - Boston 3 Buffalo 4 (OT)
 April 24 - Boston 5 Buffalo 6 (OT)

Buffalo wins best-of-seven series 4–0

Adams Division Finals

Montreal vs. Buffalo

The long-awaited series between Patrick Roy and Grant Fuhr had finally arrived. The Canadiens swept the series, winning every game by a score of 4–3; three of the four the games in overtime.
 May 2 - Buffalo 3 Montreal 4
 May 4 - Buffalo 3 Montreal 4 (OT)
 May 6 - Montreal 4 Buffalo 3 (OT)
 May 8 - Montreal 4 Buffalo 3 (OT)

Montreal wins best-of-seven series 4–0

Player statistics

Forwards
Note: GP = Games played; G = Goals; A = Assists; Pts = Points; PIM = Penalty minutes

* - player was traded during season; stats only include games played with Buffalo

Defencemen
Note: GP = Games played; G = Goals; A = Assists; Pts = Points; PIM = Penalty minutes

* - player was traded during season; stats only include games played with Buffalo

Goaltending
Note: GP = Games played; W = Wins; L = Losses; T = Ties; SO = Shutouts; GAA = Goals against average

Awards and records
 Pat LaFontaine, NHL Second Team All-Star
 Alexander Mogilny, NHL Second Team All-Star
 Alexander Mogilny, club record, goals in a season (76)
 Pat LaFontaine, club record, assists in a season (95)
 Pat LaFontaine, club record, points in a season (148)

Transactions
 Grant Fuhr was traded to Buffalo by Toronto with Toronto's 5th round choice (Kevin Popp) in 1995 Entry Draft for Dave Andreychuk, Daren Puppa and Buffalo's 1st round choice (Kenny Jonsson) in 1993 Entry Draft, February 2, 1993.

References
 Sabres on Hockey Database

Buffalo Sabres seasons
Buffalo
Buffalo
Buffalo
Buffalo